San Andres de Giles Partido is a partido of Buenos Aires Province in Argentina.

It is bordered by Exaltación de la Cruz in the northeast, Mercedes in the south, Luján in the southeast, Suipacha in the southeast, Carmen de Areco in the east and San Antonio de Areco in the northeast.

Places

Cities and towns

 San Andrés de Giles (partido seat), (population: 13941)
 Solís, (population: 864)
 Villa Ruiz (population: 465)
 Cucullu (population: 435)
 Azcuénaga (population: 357)
 Villa Espil (population: 167)
 Franklin (population: 71)

Other settlements

 Espora 
 Heavy 
 Tuyutí 
 La Florida 
 San Alberto 
 Barrio El Candil 
 La Rosada 
 Km 108 
 Km 125 Paraje El Cóndor

References

External links

 
 San Andrés de Giles Partido at the Ministry of the Interior 

Partidos of Buenos Aires Province
States and territories established in 1806